Aequorivita aestuarii is a Gram-negative and aerobic bacterium from the genus of Aequorivita which has been isolated from tidal-flat sediments from the Oki Island in Korea.

References

External links
Type strain of Aequorivita aestuarii at BacDive -  the Bacterial Diversity Metadatabase

Flavobacteria
Bacteria described in 2010